The 2010 Louisiana–Lafayette Ragin' Cajuns football team represented the University of Louisiana at Lafayette in the 2010 NCAA Division I FBS college football season. The Ragin' Cajans were led by ninth-year head coach Rickey Bustle and played their home games at Cajun Field. The schedule featured a nationally-televised game from Cajun Field against Oklahoma State on October 8. In five home games the average attendance at Cajun Field was 17,383, with a season-high of 25,000 attending the Oklahoma State game.

The team finished with an overall record of 3–9 overall and 3–5 in the Sun Belt Conference. Bustle was fired on November 28, 2010. During his tenure he compiled a 41–65 record, including four six-win seasons.  The team never reached a bowl game during this time.

Preseason

Award watchlists

Sun Belt Media Day

Predicted standings

Preseason All–Conference Team

Offense
TE Ladarius Green

Defense
LB Grant Fleming

Specialist
P Spencer Ortego

Roster

Schedule

Game summaries

@ Georgia

Arkansas State

Middle Tennessee

@ North Texas

Oklahoma State

@ Troy

Western Kentucky

@ Ohio

@ Ole Miss

@ Florida Atlantic

Florida International

@ Louisiana-Monroe

References

Louisiana-Lafayette
Louisiana Ragin' Cajuns football seasons
Louisiana-Lafayette Ragin' Cajuns football